Richard Huskard (fl. 1278?–1333) was an Anglo-Irish settler. He was an ancestor of the family of Skerrett, who later became one of The Tribes of Galway. Later bearers of the name included John Skerrett (Mayor) (fl.1491-1492) and John Skerrett (Augustinian) (c.1620-c.1688). An earlier Richard Huskard held land near Galway in 1278.

Huskard was the original form of the surname Skerrett. The original form was huscarl, a compound word of two distinct words in Old English, hus (house) and churl (a peasant. Presumptive descendants include

 John Skerrett (Mayor), 7th Mayor of Galway, 1491–1492.
 James Skerrett, fl. 1513–1532, Mayor of Galway.
 John Skerrett (Augustinian), Irish Preacher and Missionary, c.1620-c.1688.

See also

 Churl

References
 Henry, William (2002). Role of Honour: The Mayors of Galway City 1485-2001. Galway: Galway City Council.  
 Martyn, Adrian (2016). The Tribes of Galway: 1124-1642

People from County Galway
14th-century Irish people
Normans in Ireland
Year of birth uncertain